The 2015 NCAA National Collegiate Women's Ice Hockey Tournament involved eight schools in single-elimination play to determine the national champion of women's NCAA Division I college ice hockey. The quarterfinals were contested at the campuses of the seeded teams on March 14, 2015. The Frozen Four was played on March 20 and 22, 2015 at Ridder Arena in Minneapolis, Minnesota with the University of Minnesota as the host.

The tournament was won by Minnesota with a 4–1 win over Harvard, giving the Golden Gophers their fifth overall title and third in four years.

Qualifying teams 

For the first time, the winners of all four Division I conference tournaments received automatic berths to the NCAA tournament. The other four teams were selected at-large. The top four teams were then seeded and received home ice for the quarterfinals.

Bracket 
Quarterfinals held at home sites of seeded teams

Note: * denotes overtime period(s)

See also 

2015 NCAA Division I Men's Ice Hockey Tournament

References 

NCAA Women's Ice Hockey Tournament
1
2015 in sports in Minnesota